Vincenzo Angelo Orelli (1751-1813) was a Swiss-Italian painter, mainly of sacred subjects, active in a late baroque style.

He was born in Locarno in the Ticino, but active also in Milan and Bergamo. He is the son of the painter Giuseppe Antonio Orelli. He painted the dome of the church of Serina, Lombardy. He painted an altarpiece now in the church of San Lorenzo Martire, Zogno. He also had the name of Francesco Saverio Angelico Orelli. He trained in Milan and travelled in 1773–1775 to Rome. He was a friend of Paolo Vincenzo Bonomini.

References

1751 births
1813 deaths
Swiss painters
18th-century Italian painters
Italian male painters
19th-century Italian painters
People from Ticino
Painters from Bergamo
19th-century Italian male artists
18th-century Italian male artists